Ten of the Best was a boxed set of novels published by Penguin Books with the strapline Ten top novels from ten leading authors,

Included in the set:

The Best of Rumpole by John Mortimer
Brazzaville Beach by William Boyd
The Country Girls by Edna O'Brien
A Dark-Adapted Eye by Barbara Vine
Hawksmoor by Peter Ackroyd
Juggling by Barbara Trapido
Kowloon Tong by Paul Theroux
Other People by Martin Amis
Regeneration by Pat Barker
Virtual Light by William Gibson

See also

Great Books of the 20th Century
Penguin Essentials
Penguin Red Classics

Lists of novels
Penguin Books book series